Taste the Secret is the second studio album by the southern Californian hip hop trio Ugly Duckling, released on June 16, 2003, by Emperor Norton Records. For the album, Ugly Duckling developed a fictitious fast food chain called "Meatshake" that served only meat-based food served in shake form. A web site featuring the restaurant chain was also developed as part of the album's marketing campaign.

Track listing

MeatShake
"MeatShake," a fictitious chain of restaurants offering meat-based thick shakes, was created as a promotional gimmick for the release. As a concept album, it was about working at a fast-food chain and its inter-business war with Veggie Hut, an all-vegetarian fast-food stand.

When it was operational, MeatShake's web site appeared to be a fully functional site promoting a small Long Beach-area-based fast food restaurant, whose corporate mission was meat—and lots of it—served in the form of milkshakes. The site also had a list of restaurants (the addresses of which were area McDonald's restaurants), employees of the month, and storefront pictures (one of which appeared to be an In-N-Out Burger). The site is no longer maintained.

References 

2003 albums
Ugly Duckling (hip hop group) albums
Concept albums
Rap operas
Emperor Norton Records albums
Rykodisc albums